is a railway station on the West Japan Railway Company JR Tōzai Line in Kita-ku, Osaka, Japan. The station's location is close to the Osaka Temmangu Shrine.

Lines
West Japan Railway Company JR Tōzai Line
Osaka Municipal Subway (Minami-morimachi Station)
Tanimachi Line (T21)
Sakaisuji Line (K13)

Layout
There is an island platform with two tracks.

History 
Ōsakatemmangū Station opened on 8 March 1997, coinciding with the opening of the JR Tōzai Line between Kyobashi and Amagasaki.

Station numbering was introduced in March 2018 with Ōsakatemmangū being assigned station number JR-H43.

Surroundings
Osaka Temmangu Shrine
Japan National Route 1 (Sonezaki-dori)
Osaka Prefectural Route 14 Osaka Takatsuki Kyoto Route (Tenjimbashisuji)
Osaka Prefectural Route 102 Ebisu minami-morimachi Route (Tenjimbashisuji)
Japan Mint
Temma Tenjin Hanjotei
Daiwa Minami-morimachi Building
Resona Bank
FM802
Tenjimbashisuji Shopping Arcade
Sumitomo Mitsui Banking Corporation
The Yomiuri Shimbun Osaka

Adjacent stations

References

External links 

 Official station website (in Japanese)

Railway stations in Osaka Prefecture
JR Tōzai Line
Railway stations in Japan opened in 1997